Coamo is a town and municipality founded in 1579 in the south-central region of Puerto Rico, located north of Santa Isabel; south of Orocovis and Barranquitas; east of Villalba and Juana Díaz; and west of Aibonito and Salinas. Coamo is spread over 10 barrios and Coamo Pueblo – the downtown area and the administrative center of the city. It is both a principal city of the Coamo Micropolitan Statistical Area and the Ponce-Yauco-Coamo Combined Statistical Area.

It was named San Blas Illescas de Coamo by its first settlers. Saint Blaise (San Blas) was the Catholic saint who remains the town's patron. Illescas is the Spanish town where the town founders originated (nowadays in Toledo province, Castile-La Mancha, Spain).

There are several theories regarding the origin of the word "Coamo". Some think it comes from an indigenous word that means "valley" but it is also plausible that Coamo derives its name from Coamex (or Coamey), who was a celebrated local cacique (or "chieftain" in the Taino language). Archeological digs near the region have produced some of the best examples of the island's pre-Columbian cultural artifacts.

Coamo has a series of natural hot springs, Los Baños de Coamo. The Battle of Coamo was a decisive battle of the Spanish–American War (1898).

History
Founded on July 15, 1579, Coamo is the third-oldest settlement of the island's post-Columbian period (after San Juan in the north and San Germán in the west). By 1582, there were twenty families living in Coamo, in the same area where the Tainos had had their village of Guayama. Coamo officially became a town in 1616, and was given the title of "Villa" by Spanish Royal Decree in 1778.

Coamo was the administrative center that encompassed most of the southern half of the island during the early colonial period. As the agricultural and sugar industries grew and became the mainstays of the colony's economy, the province would eventually subdivide into several distinct municipalities, and the administrative center of the region would later shift west to the coastal town of Ponce.

Coamo is the home of a series of natural hot springs, Los Baños de Coamo, which have attracted visitors since before the Spaniards landed. These springs were once rumored to have been Juan Ponce de León's legendary fountain of youth. In the early nineteenth century, a system of pools of varying depths, sizes and temperatures was constructed at the site of these springs to serve as a spa for the colonials. During the American invasion in the Spanish–American War (1898), this site was the scene of one of the decisive battles of that conflict (the Battle of Coamo). The American troops took possession of the island, and the spa was subsequently abandoned. Though the site lay in ruins for most of the twentieth century, it continued to be a landmark to the Coameños, who would often go to bathe in its healing thermal waters. The pools remain, but the old buildings which once hosted the island's affluent and colonial soldiers are gone, except for the remains of one central wall structure. It has been preserved and incorporated into a fountain courtyard on the grounds of a popular tourist hotel and rest area and has replaced the ancient Spanish ruins.

Puerto Rico was ceded by Spain in the aftermath of the Spanish–American War under the terms of the Treaty of Paris of 1898 and became a territory of the United States. In 1899, the United States Department of War conducted a census of Puerto Rico finding that the population of Coamo was 15,144. 

Hurricane Maria on September 20, 2017 triggered numerous landslides in Coamo with the significant amount of rainfall. As of October 9, no one in Coamo had electrical service, only 15% of Coamo had access to clean drinking water, and several people on dialysis had died. Around 2,000 homes were partially or completely destroyed. The iconic  was a total loss.

Geography 
Coamo is located in the South Central region of Puerto Rico.

Barrios 
Like all municipalities of Puerto Rico, Coamo is subdivided into barrios.

 Coamo Arriba
 Coamo barrio-pueblo
 Cuyón
 Hayales
 Los Llanos
 Palmarejo
 Pasto
 Pedro García
 Pulguillas
 San Ildefonso
 Santa Catalina

Sectors
Barrios (which are like minor civil divisions) and subbarrios, in turn, are further subdivided into smaller local populated place areas/units called sectores (sectors in English). The types of sectores may vary, from normally sector to urbanización to reparto to barriada to residencial, among others.

Special Communities

 (Special Communities of Puerto Rico) are marginalized communities whose citizens are experiencing a certain amount of social exclusion. A map shows these communities occur in nearly every municipality of the commonwealth. Of the 742 places that were on the list in 2014, the following barrios, communities, sectors, or neighborhoods were in Coamo: Zambrana neighborhood, Cuyón, Sector Varsovia in El Cerro, Río Jueyes, and Sector Sabana Hoyo.

Economy

Agriculture
Coamo is an agricultural center where mangoes, corn, guanabanas, tamarindo, quenepas, avocados, oranges and plantains are grown, and where poultry and cattle are raised.

Industry
Coamo is a trading center for machinery, aircraft radio components, and clothing.

Tourism

Landmarks and places of interest
There are eight places in Coamo listed on the US National Register of Historic Places:
Casa Blanca de Coamo
Ermita Nuestra Señora de la Valvanera
Iglesia San Blas de Illescas, construction on the church began in 1661 and it is one of the oldest parishes in Puerto Rico
Puente de las Calabazas 
General Méndez Vigo Bridge
Puente Padre Iñigo 
Picó Pomar Residence, now a museum
Carretera Central, a highway that runs through several municipalities including Coamo

Some of the landmarks of Coamo are:
 Los Baños de Coamo (Coamo Thermal Baths) – near the border with Santa Isabel
 Puente de Las Flores

Culture

Festivals and events
Coamo celebrates its patron saint festival in February. The  is a religious and cultural celebration that generally features parades, games, artisans, amusement rides, regional food, and live entertainment.

Other festivals and events celebrated in Coamo include:
 San Blas Half Marathon – February
 Crafts festival in honor of the municipal flag – June
 Coamo Anniversary – July
 Concert and lighting of the Christmas tree – December

Sports
Coamo is famous for being the host of the San Blas Half-Marathon, a yearly world-class professional marathon that attracts the best competitive runners in the world. It was inaugurated in 1963 by Delta Phi Delta fraternity in honor to the founder of the town. World-class international and local runners compete in a  half-marathon. It is Puerto Rico's biggest race, and the crowds are always large.

The Maratonistas de Coamo (from the BSN) is the only professional team which the town hosts. The team has played in Coamo with mixed success since joining the league in 1985.

Demographics

Government

All municipalities in Puerto Rico are administered by a mayor, elected every four years. The current mayor of Coamo is Juan Carlos García Padilla, of the Popular Democratic Party (PPD). He was elected at the 2000 general elections.

The city belongs to the Puerto Rico Senatorial district VI, which is represented by two senators. In 2012, Miguel Pereira Castillo and Angel M. Rodríguez were elected as district senators.

Transportation
There are 31 bridges in Coamo.

Education
Coamo's first school was built in 1901.

Symbols
The  has an official flag and coat of arms.

Flag
The flag of Coamo derives its colors from the coat of arms. Its colors are red, yellow, and black.

Coat of arms
The top left and the lower right have a red background with a gold Episcopal hat each. These parts of the coat of arms represent the old seat of San Blas de Illescas. The horse and the bull represent the cattle wealth of the population. The gold color that serves as background in contrast with the black color, recalls the yellowish reddish tone of the fields of Coamo during the droughts. The heavy border of the coat of arms contains the following figures: two flames; three bell towers with gold bells outlined in red; two red crosses with arms ending in three petals; and a circle with a surface divided by horizontal blue and silver-plated stripes.

Notable people
Some of its notable people include:
 Lely Burgos, Olympic athlete,
 Bobby Capó, singer, composer
 Margarita Nolasco, senator and Vice-President of the Senate of Puerto Rico
 Antonio García Padilla, former President of the University of Puerto Rico
 Jose Garriga Pico, former senator
 Willie Rosario, musician, composer and bandleader of salsa music
 Alejandro García Padilla, Governor of Puerto Rico
 Victor Caratini, Catcher for the Chicago Cubs

Gallery

See also

 List of Puerto Ricans
 History of Puerto Rico
 Did you know-Puerto Rico?

References

Sources
 Historia de Coamo, "La Villa Añeja", Ramon Rivera Bermúdez, 1980.

External links

 Coamo and its barrios, United States Census Bureau
 Historic Places in Puerto Rico and the Virgin Islands, a National Park Service Discover Our Shared Heritage Travel Itinerary
 
 Welcome to Puerto Rico! Coamo
 Coamo Municipality on Facebook

 
Municipalities of Puerto Rico
Populated places established in 1579
1579 establishments in the Spanish Empire